Hjulsta metro station is a station on the blue line of the Stockholm metro, located in Hjulsta, northern Stockholm. The station was opened on 31 August 1975 as the northern terminus of the first stretch of the Blue Line from T-Centralen. The trains were then running via Hallonbergen and Rinkeby.

References

External links
Images of Hjulsta

Blue line (Stockholm metro) stations
Railway stations opened in 1975
1975 establishments in Sweden